In psychology, trait theory (also called dispositional theory) is an approach to the study of human personality. Trait theorists are primarily interested in the measurement of traits, which can be defined as habitual patterns of behaviour, thought, and emotion. According to this perspective, traits are aspects of personality that are relatively stable over time, differ across individuals (e.g. some people are outgoing whereas others are not), are relatively consistent over situations, and influence behaviour. Traits are in contrast to states, which are more transitory dispositions.

In some theories and systems, traits are something a person either has or does not have, but in many others traits are dimensions such as extraversion vs. introversion, with each person rating somewhere along this spectrum. 

Trait theory suggests that some natural behaviours may give someone an advantage in a position of leadership.

There are two approaches to define traits: as internal causal properties or as purely descriptive summaries. The internal causal definition states that traits influence our behaviours, leading us to do things in line with that trait. On the other hand, traits as descriptive summaries are descriptions of our actions that do not try to infer causality.

History
Gordon Allport was an early pioneer in the study of traits. This early work was viewed as the beginning of the modern psychological study of personality. He also referred to traits within his work as dispositions. In his approach, "cardinal" traits are those that dominate and shape a person's behavior; their ruling passions/obsessions, such as a need for money, fame etc. By contrast, "central" traits such as honesty are characteristics found in some degree in every person – and finally "secondary" traits are those seen only in certain circumstances (such as particular likes or dislikes that a very close friend may know), which are included to provide a complete picture of human complexity.

A wide variety of alternative theories and scales were later developed, including:
 Raymond Cattell's 16PF Questionnaire
 J. P. Guilford's Structure of Intellect 
 Henry Murray's System of Needs
 Timothy Leary's Interpersonal circumplex
 Myers–Briggs Type Indicator
 Gray's Biopsychological theory of personality

Currently, two general approaches are the most popular:

 Eysenck Personality Questionnaire, (EPQ) ("the three-factor model"). Using factor analysis Hans Eysenck suggested that personality is reducible to three major traits: neuroticism, extraversion, and psychoticism. 
 Big Five personality traits, ("the five-factor model"). Many psychologists currently believe that five factors are sufficient: neuroticism, extraversion, openness to experience, agreeableness, and conscientiousness.

Trait theory in cross-cultural use 
Cultures are widely known and accepted as being different in varying degrees. This can make the study of personality difficult as meaning and the expression of traits may be different within cultural groups. Trait theory uses a hierarchy of traits in order to separate culture from the traits; it can be said the culture is ignored in order to focus on the individual traits and how they are connected to the individual. Gordon Allport's trait theory not only served as a foundational approach within personality psychology, but also is continued to be viewed and discussed by other disciplines such as anthropology because of how he approached culture within trait theory.

Trait theory tends to focus on the individual over the situation in which they are in. This focus has relaxed within modern studies allowing for a consideration of the external factors outside of the self. As the focus becomes more relaxed (but still prominent as it is a main part of the theory) research expands.

Comparing EPQ and Big Five

Testing methodology, and factors
Both the EPQ and Big Five approaches extensively use self-report questionnaires. The factors are intended to be orthogonal (uncorrelated), though there are often small positive correlations between factors. The five factor model in particular has been criticized for losing the orthogonal structure between factors. Hans Eysenck has argued that fewer factors are superior to a larger number of partly related ones. Although these two approaches are comparable because of the use of factor analysis to construct hierarchical taxonomies, they differ in the organization and number of factors.

Whatever the causes, psychoticism marks the two approaches apart, as the five factor model contains no such trait. Moreover, psychoticism, unlike any of the other factors in either approach, does not fit a normal distribution curve. Indeed, scores are rarely high, thus skewing a normal distribution. However, when they are high, there is considerable overlap with psychiatric conditions such as antisocial and schizoid personality disorders. Similarly, high scorers on neuroticism are more susceptible to sleep and psychosomatic disorders. Five factor approaches can also predict future mental disorders.

Lower-order factors 

There are two higher-order factors that both taxonomies clearly share: extraversion and neuroticism. Both approaches broadly accept that extraversion is associated with sociability and positive affect, whereas neuroticism is associated with emotional instability and negative affect.

Many lower-order factors, or facets, are similar between the two taxonomies. For instance, both approaches contain factors for sociability/gregariousness, for activity levels, and for assertiveness within the higher order factor extraversion. However, there are differences too. First, the three-factor approach contains nine lower-order factors and the five-factor approach has six.

Eysenck's psychoticism factor incorporates some of the polar opposites of the lower order factors of openness, agreeableness and conscientiousness. A high scorer on tough-mindedness in psychoticism would score low on tender-mindedness in agreeableness. Most of the differences between the taxonomies stem from the three factor model's emphasis on fewer high-order factors.

Causality
Although both major trait models are descriptive, only the three-factor model offers a detailed causal explanation. Eysenck suggests that different personality traits are caused by the properties of the brain, which themselves are the result of genetic factors. In particular, the three-factor model identifies the reticular system and the limbic system in the brain as key components that mediate cortical arousal and emotional responses respectively. Eysenck advocates that extraverts have low levels of cortical arousal and introverts have high levels, leading extraverts to seek out more stimulation from socializing and being venturesome. Moreover, Eysenck surmised that there would be an optimal level of arousal, after which inhibition would occur and that this would be different for each person.

In a similar vein, the three-factor approach theorizes that neuroticism is mediated by levels of arousal in the limbic system and that individual differences arise because of variable activation thresholds between people. Therefore, highly neurotic people when presented with minor stressors, will exceed this threshold, whereas people low in neuroticism will not exceed normal activation levels, even when presented with large stressors. By contrast, proponents of the five-factor approach assume a role of genetics and environment but offer no explicit causal explanation.

Given this emphasis on biology in the three-factor approach, it would be expected that the third trait, psychoticism, would have a similar explanation. However, the causal properties of this state are not well defined. Eysenck has suggested that psychoticism is related to testosterone levels and is an inverse function of the serotonergic system, but he later revised this, linking it instead to the dopaminergic system.

List of personality traits

See also
16 Personality Factors
Alternative five model of personality
Big Five personality traits
Cultural schema theory
HEXACO model of personality structure
Minnesota Multiphasic Personality Inventory
NEO-PI
Personality psychology
Szondi test
Trait activation theory
Social investment theory

References

Personality theories
Personality traits